Damares Alvez Bezerra de Oliveira (born January 30, 1980), known as Damares, is a Brazilian gospel singer. Popularly known as "Diva of Pentecostal Music", her talent awarded trophies in the categories of "Album of the Year", "Song of the Year" among others and Promises in the categories of "Best Video", "Best Singer" among others. The Revelation album has sold over 600,000 copies, making Damares become known in Brazil and abroad.

Their newest album, Diamante (Diamond) has sold over 400,000 copies is between making more CDs sold in 2011, according to ABPD, only behind artists like Paula Fernandes, Father Marcelo Rossi and Fabio de Melo. In exclusive list of international artists this singer in ninth place, but the list of national singer getting up a position in eighth place. The singer was the only Christian among musicians. Also on the list were the singer Ludmila Ferber, in sixteenth place with "O Poder da Aliança" and the musical group Diante do Trono, in the position of twelfth best selling DVD in 2011.

Biography 
Damares is the daughter of the Pastor Antonio and Rosa Maria Bezerra (née Alvez), Damares is younger sister of seven brothers. She studied at the Municipal School of Augusto Angels. Damares is married to the pastor Aldori de Oliveira. They married when she was just 16 years.

The singer became known in the gospel world in 2008, when she released the album Revelation, which sold over 600,000 copies, including the song "Sabor de Mel" (lit. "Taste of Honey"), which became a fever on the radio segment, and earned her several Talento Trophy awards in 2009, having won the Revelation category alongside Mariana Valadão.

In 2009, in Curitiba she was recording a live album recorded on CD and DVD. The following year, the singer closes contract with Sony Music and released the album Diamante, which sold 130,000 copies in a month, and how is the album title, is a diamond with more than 300,000 copies sold.

In 2011, the singer was nominated in several categories in the Trophy Promessas, and on October 22 the same year she recorded a live DVD with an audience of more than 60,000 people. The recording was made during the event Glorifica Litoral, in the city of São Sebastião, São Paulo, and still others brought singers and groups like the Rescue. It is on record views on YouTube. Only a music video for "Sabor de Mel" has more than five million views, and the song "Um Novo Vencedor" from his latest album was nearly half a million views a month. She also was one of those invited to participate in the Festival Promessas, an event that brought together some 20, 000 people in Flamengo Park and aired on Rede Globo. Besides Damares, the singers were fellow gospel singer Fernandinho, Eyshila, Fernanda Brum, Davi Sacer, Pregador Luo, Ludmila Ferber, Regis Danese and Diante do Trono. The transmission of the event was a success on TV, making the station was isolated leader of audience.

Damares also received the title of "Ambassador of Peace" by the United Nations.

Discography 
 Studio Albums

Live Albums

Video Albums

Awards and nominations 
Troféu Talento

|-
|rowspan="6" align="center" |2009
| align="center"|Apocalypse
| align="center"|Album of the Year
|
|-
| align="center"|Sabor de Mel
| align="center"|Music of the Year
|
|-
| align="center"|Apocalypse
| align="center"|Album Pentecostals
|
|-
| align="center"|Damares
| align="center"|Featured of 2008
|
|-
| align="center"|"Damares"
| align="center"|"Singer of the year"
|
|-
| align="center"|Damares
| align="center"|Revelation Women
|

Troféu Promessas

|-
|rowspan="4" align="center"|2011
| align="center"|Um Novo Vencedor
| align="center"|Best Video
|
|-
| align="center"|Um Novo Vencedor
| align="center"|Best Music
|
|-
| align="center"|Damares
| align="center"|Best Singer
|
|-
| align="center"|Diamante ("Diamond")
| align="center"|Best CD / Best Album
|
|-
|rowspan="5" align="center"|2012
| align="center"|Ao Vivo em São Sebastião ("Live in San Sebastian")
| align="center"|Best CD/Best Album
|
|-
| align="center"|Consolador e Sabor de Mel ("Comforter and Taste of Honey")
| align="center"|Best Music
|
|-
| align="center"|Damares
| align="center"|Best Singer
|
|-
| align="center"|Ao Vivo em São Sebastião ("Live in San Sebastian")
| align="center"|Best DVD/Blu-ray
|
|-
| align="center"|Ao Vivo em São Sebastião ("Live in San Sebastian")
| align="center"|Best CD Pentecostal
|

References

External links 
 Official website

1980 births
People from Umuarama
Brazilian gospel singers
Brazilian Pentecostals
Living people
21st-century Brazilian singers
21st-century Brazilian women singers